The Hutou Mountain Park is a park in Guishan District and Taoyuan District of Taoyuan City, Taiwan.

Name
Hutou means "tiger head" in Chinese.

Geology
The mountain is shaped like a tiger, thus giving the park its name.

Features
There are many hiking routes connecting playgrounds, barbeque sites, temples, and other scenic spots. The park is powered by renewable energy, with a windmill at the entrance. Eco-friendly engineering methods are also used.

Transportation
The park is accessible by walking 2.5km (1.6 miles) northeast of Taoyuan Station of the Taiwan Railways Administration.

See also
 Geography of Taiwan

References

Landforms of Taoyuan City
Parks in Taoyuan
Tourist attractions in Taoyuan City